Hasan Zaydan is an Iraqi politician and a former member of the Iraqi National Assembly with the Iraqi National Dialogue Front.

He led the National Front for a Free and United Iraq, which joined with other Sunni Arab parties to form the Iraqi National Dialogue Front prior to the December 2005 elections.

References
 Political Parties (Re)Align For December Elections

Members of the Council of Representatives of Iraq
Living people
Year of birth missing (living people)
Place of birth missing (living people)
21st-century Iraqi politicians